False Bottom Creek is a stream in the U.S. state of South Dakota.

False Bottom Creek was named for the fact is a losing stream along some of its course.

See also
List of rivers of South Dakota

References

Rivers of Butte County, South Dakota
Rivers of Lawrence County, South Dakota
Rivers of South Dakota